Ryan Anthony Austin, born 15 November 1981 in Arima, Trinidad and Tobago, is a West Indies cricketer.

A lower-order right-handed batsman and a right-arm off-spin bowler, Austin played 22 first-class matches for Barbados between the 2000–01 and 2006–07 seasons, and five for West Indies B in the 2003–04 season.

His highest score in first-class cricket was 56 not out in a losing cause for Barbados against Windward Islands at Bridgetown in 2001–02. He has taken five wickets or more in an innings four times, and his best bowling was six for 86 for Barbados against Leeward Islands at Crab Hill in the Carib Beer Cup in 2006–07, when he was also named Man of the Match.

Austin made his Test debut on 9 July 2009. He was part of an understrength team fielded by the West Indies against Bangladesh; the 15-man squad included nine uncapped players. Including Austin, seven West Indies players made their Test debut in the match and the side was captained by Floyd Reifer who had played the last of his four Tests ten years earlier. The first XI had made themselves unavailable due to a pay dispute with the West Indies Cricket Board.

References

1981 births
Barbados cricketers
Living people
Trinidad and Tobago emigrants to Barbados
West Indies Test cricketers
Combined Campuses and Colleges cricketers
Trinidad and Tobago cricketers
People from Arima
West Indies B cricketers